The 208th Coastal Division was an infantry division of the Royal Italian Army during World War II. Royal Italian Army coastal divisions were second line divisions formed with reservists and equipped with second rate materiel. Recruited locally, they were often commanded by officers called out of retirement.

History 
The division was activated on 15 November 1941 in Palermo by reorganizing the VIII Coastal Sector Command. The division was assigned to XII Army Corps, which was responsible for the defense of the western half of the island of Sicily. The division was responsible for the coastal defense of the coast between, but excluding the cities of Palermo and Trapani. 

The division fought against units of the American Seventh Army after the allies landed on Sicily on 10 July 1943. By 21 July 1943 the division had been severely decimated and was therefore officially declared lost due to wartime events.

In July 1943 the 208th division was commanded by General Giovanni Marciani, who doubled as commander of Coastal Troops Command of XII Army Corps.

Organization 
 208th Coastal Division
 133rd Coastal Regiment
 LXI Replacements Battalion
 CCXLIV Coastal Battalion
 CDXXIII Coastal Battalion
 CDXCVIII Coastal Battalion
 136th Coastal Regiment (became an autonomous unit responsible for the coast between Palermo and Santo Stefano di Camastra in July 1943)
 CCCLXXX Coastal Battalion
 CCCLXXXII Coastal Battalion
 CDXIII Coastal Battalion
 147th Coastal Regiment (joined the division in July 1943)
 CCCLXXVIII Coastal Battalion
 CDXXXVIII Coastal Battalion
 DXXXIX Coastal Battalion
 28th Coastal Artillery Regiment
 XIX Coastal Artillery Group (105/28 howitzers)
 CXXIV Coastal Artillery Group (75/27 field guns)
 CCXV Coastal Artillery Group (100/22 howitzers)
 XLI Coastal Artillery Group (75/27 field guns and 105/28 howitzers; transferred to the XXIX Coastal Brigade - Harbor Defense Command "N")
 CV Machine Gun Battalion
 518th Machine Gun Company
 519th Machine Gun Company
 618th Machine Gun Company
 619th Machine Gun Company
 133rd Mixed Engineer Platoon
 208th Carabinieri Section
 165th Field Post Office
 Division Services

Attached to the division:
 Armored Train 152/1/T, in Termini Imerese (4x 152/40 naval guns, 4x 20/77 anti-aircraft guns)
 Armored Train 152/2/T, in Carini (4x 152/40 naval guns, 4x 20/77 anti-aircraft guns)

Commanding officers 
The division's commanding officers were:

 Generale di Divisione Gaetano Binacchi (15 November 1941 - 27 April 1943)
 Generale di Divisione Giovanni Marciani (28 April 1943 - 21 July 1943, POW)

References 

 
 

Coastal divisions of Italy
Infantry divisions of Italy in World War II